Iwate 2nd district is a single-member constituency of the House of Representatives in the National Diet of Japan. It is located on the island of Honshu, in Iwate Prefecture, and includes the cities of Kuji, Miyako, and Rikuzentakata, among others. 

As of 2020, the district was home to 376,270 constituents.

The district is represented by Shun'ichi Suzuki of the Liberal Democratic Party.

2011 Earthquake and Tsunami 
The impact of the 2011 Tōhoku earthquake and tsunami was concentrated in Fukushima, Miyagi, and Iwate prefectures. As the 2nd district contains all of Iwate's coastline, it was hit the hardest of Iwate's three districts and was one of the worst affected districts in all of Japan.

References 

Iwate Prefecture
Districts of the House of Representatives (Japan)